Fountain Hills is a town in Maricopa County, Arizona, United States. Known for its impressive fountain, once the tallest in the world, it borders the Fort McDowell Yavapai Nation, Salt River Pima-Maricopa Indian Community, and Scottsdale. The population was 23,820 as of the 2020 census. Between the 1990 and 2000 censuses it was the eighth-fastest-growing place among cities and towns in Arizona. The median value of an owner-occupied housing during the period 2016-2020 was estimated at $402,100.

History 
Before the development of Fountain Hills, the area was home to the Yavapai people, and petroglyphs can be found near the Dixie Mine in the northwest corner of the town along the mountains.

In the early 20th century, the area that became Fountain Hills and the McDowell Mountain Regional Park was part of the Pemberton Ranch, later renamed the P-Bar Ranch. Fountain Hills High School is built on the site of one of the P-Bar Ranch's buildings, and a plaque stands in the parking lot to commemorate this.

Fountain Hills was developed by C. V. Wood, president of McCulloch Oil, and was named after the towering man-made fountain in the center of town. The town was incorporated in 1989.

Geography 
Fountain Hills is in eastern Maricopa County, on the eastern edge of the Phoenix urbanized area. The elevation reaches  on the western border of the town, on a spur of the McDowell Mountains.

To the east of the town is the Verde River, a tributary to the Salt River. Inside the town there are many washes that run through Fountain Hills into the Verde River. Some of these washes include the Ashbrook, Balboa, Legend, and Colony Washes. During times of rain the washes flood with water and can sometimes block roads with their water. Signs mark several of the intersections of washes and major streets in the town.

To the southwest and northwest regions of Fountain Hills are the McDowell Mountains, a chain of extinct volcanic remnants. The highest mountains in the range are East End, McDowell Peak, and Thompson Peak, all in neighboring Scottsdale.

Climate 
The area has a large amount of sunshine year round due to its stable descending air and high pressure. According to the Köppen Climate Classification system, Fountain Hills has a hot desert climate, abbreviated "Bwh" on climate maps.

Demographics 

As of the census of 2020, there were 23,820 people in 11,918 households in the town. The ethnic makeup of the town was 94.1% White, 1.0% Black or African American, 0.6% Native American, 1.8% Asian, 0.1% Native Hawaiian and Other Pacific Islander, 1.1% from other races, and 1.4% from two or more races. Hispanic or Latino of any race make up 4.1% of the population.

There were 11,918 households, out of which 18.6% had children under the age of 18 living with them, 59.4% were married couples living together, 6.7% had a female householder with no husband present, and 31.1% were non-families. Householders living alone make up 25.7% of all households, and 11.5% had someone living alone who was 65 years of age or older. The average household size was 2.16 and the average family size was 2.56.

In the town, the population was spread out, with 14.4% under the age of 18, 85.6% 18 years and over, and 27.8% who were 65 years of age or older. The median age was 53.9 years. There were 47.8% males and 52.2% females.

According to the 2020 American Community Survey, the median income for a household in Fountain Hills for the period 2016-2020 was $85,200.

The per capita income for the town was $59,791. About 3.3% of families and 4.6% of the population were below the poverty line, including 3.5% of those under age 18 and 3.6% of those age 65 or over.

Arts and culture

The Fountain
Fountain Hills has the world's fourth-tallest fountain, and the second tallest in the United States. It was built in 1970 in Zürich, Switzerland, by Robert P. McCulloch, the year before the reconstruction of the London Bridge in Lake Havasu City, another of McCulloch's projects. The fountain sprays water for about 15 minutes every hour on the hour between 9am and 9pm. The plume rises from a concrete water-lily sculpture in the center of a large man-made lake. When built it was the world's tallest fountain, a record it held for over a decade.

The Town of Fountain Hills has partnered with EarthCam to bring live streaming views of its world-famous fountain. The live stream camera can be accessed on the Experience Fountain Hills website.
To help celebrate the fountain's 50th year, the town installed a new LED lighting system with four lights mounted directly under the fountain and six lights on the shore for a total of 10 lights to provide ample lighting and still meet the Dark Skies regulations.

International Dark Sky Community 
In January 2018, the town of Fountain Hills was designated an International Dark Sky Community by the International Dark Sky Association. The town is one of only two International Dark Sky Communities located near a large metropolitan area. , 34 communities in the world have earned the Community designation, among Dark Sky Reserves, Parks, and Sanctuaries. The Fountain Hills Dark Sky Association (FHDSA) worked with town council and town staff to change outdoor lighting and sign ordinances to address light pollution. This designation is a result of both geography and lighting ordinances. The community is shielded from the lights of the larger cities in the Phoenix metro region by the McDowell Mountains to the west. The Fort McDowell Yavapai Nation to the east, the Salt River Pima-Maricopa Indian Community to the south, and the McDowell Mountain Regional Park all help the town preserve its dark skies. The absence of street lights and the presence of only low-impact outdoor lighting creates an outstanding environment for stargazing. The Fountain Hills Dark Sky Association is currently working to develop a  International Dark Sky Discovery Center that will include a Dark Sky Observatory, Hyperspace Planetarium, Inspiration Theater, and an Immersion Zone. Fountain Hills was the home to Charles W. Juels' Fountain Hills Observatory , where 475 asteroids were discovered between 1999 and 2003, including 20898 Fountainhills.

Events
The town hosts a number of events each year at Fountain Park, including three large art fairs: the Spring Fountain Festival of Fine Arts and Crafts and the Fall Fountain Festival of Fine Arts and Crafts, both presented by the Fountain Hills Chamber of Commerce, and the Thunderbird Artists' Fountain Hills Fine Art Festival. Each year, the town hosts a St. Patrick's Day celebration in which the town's fountain is dyed green. Other signature events include a 4th of July celebration, an annual Music Fest, Irish Fest, and Concours in the Hills — a car show which featured over 1,000 vehicles and 50,000 attendees in February 2023.

Arts 
Fountain Hills is home to one of the largest public art collections in Arizona. The art collection, which features over 150 pieces, is part of a partnership between the Town of Fountains Hills and the Public Art Committee of the Fountain Hills Cultural and Civic Association. Art is a significant part of the Town's heritage. The eight fountains along the Avenue of the Fountains were the beginning of the public art collection. Bronze sculptures and fountains with Community Profile themes ranging from the whimsical to the serious dot the streets and adorn the public buildings, plazas and parks. The collection also contains a wide variety of other art types and media, including paintings, stone, photography and metals. Residents and visitors are invited to wander the streets or take the "Art Walk" guided tour.

Fountain Hills Theater is a performing arts venue entering its 28th season and offering over 16 productions a year to local communities as well as performing an arts education year-round for youth.

Government
Fountain Hills has a council-manager system. The current mayor of Fountain Hills is Ginny Dickey, first elected in August 2018, and reelected in 2020 and 2022.  The current Town Council consists of the mayor and six councilmembers: Vice Mayor Peggy McMahonCouncilmembers Brenda Kalivianakis (2022), Gerry Friedel (2020), Sharron Grzybowski (2020), Hannah Toth (2022), and Allen Skilicorn (2022). Grady Miller has been serving as the Town Manager since 2015. Among other council-appointed staff are Town Attorney Aaron Aronson and Town Magistrate Robert Melton.

The town contracts its law enforcement services with the Maricopa County Sheriff's Office (MCSO).

The Fountain Hills Fire Department has two fire stations and contracts with Rural Metro for staffing. Dave Ott is the Fire Chief.

Fountain Hills is in Arizona's 6th Congressional District, served by Representative David Schweikert, and Arizona's 3rd State Legislative District, served by Representatives Joseph Chaplik (R) and Alexander Kolodin (R). John Kavanagh represents the area in the Arizona Senate.

Education
Fountain Hills Public Schools are part of the Fountain Hills Unified School District #98. The district has two elementary schools, one middle school and one high school, Fountain Hills High School. The District has small class sizes at an average of 18:1, a Vibrant Special Education Program, Fountain Hills Virtual Academy, and a Career and Technical Education Program. 

School accolades and achievements include: 

 A+ rating from the Arizona Educational Foundation (McDowell Mountain Elementary School and Fountain Hills High School) 
 Ranked #32 in Arizona in 2021 by the U.S. News & World Report (Fountain Hills High School) 
 Ranked in the top 5% of schools in the US in 2017 by the U.S. News & World Report (Fountain Hills High School)
 2017 Girls Soccer State Champions
 2017 Boys Basketball State Champions
 2017 Beach Volleyball State Champions
 2017 Girls Track & Field State Champions
 2017 Volleyball State Champions
 2018 Beach Volleyball State Champions
 2019 Beach Volleyball State Runner-Up

Media

The Fountain Hills Times is the town's weekly newspaper. The paper has a weekly circulation of about 3,000.

The parent company of the Times, Western States Publishers, Inc., also publishes the Fountain Hills/Rio Verde Telephone Directory, Fountain Hills Community Guide, Fountain Hills HOME.

Notable people

 Kathy Ahern, professional golfer
 Steven Alker, professional golfer.
 Joe Arpaio, former Maricopa County Sheriff
 Charles Juels, astronomer
 David Schweikert, U.S. Congressman
 Allen Skillicorn (born 1974), member of the Illinois House of Representatives from 2017 to 2021. He moved to Fountain Hills after his legislative tenure.

Sister cities

  – Concepcion de Ataco, El Salvador
  – Dierdorf (Rhineland-Palatinate, Germany)
  – Zamość, Poland

Gallery

The Stoneman Road, established by Colonel George Stoneman, was an important supply road between Fort McDowell and Fort Whipple in Prescott between 1870 and 1890 on what is today the Yavapai Reservation near Fountain Hills. The trail passed through the McDowell Mountains. The McDowell Mountains is a chain of extinct volcanic mountains in Fountain Hills.

References

External links

 
 
 
 
 

 
Towns in Maricopa County, Arizona
Phoenix metropolitan area
Fountains in the United States
1989 establishments in Arizona